Hannia Guillen (born 1982 in Ciego de Ávila, Cuba) is a Cuban-American actress. She is best known for her portrayal of Paloma Lopez-Fitzgerald on the NBC daytime television soap opera Passions from October 16, 2007, to 2008. She also had a supporting role in an episode of the TV series Burn Notice, playing the upwardly-mobile girlfriend of an Israeli gun runner.

Biography
Guillen and her family emigrated to the United States from Cuba in 1993. She holds an Associate of Arts degree from Miami Dade College.

References

External links

Cuban soap opera actresses
Cuban television actresses
Miami Dade College alumni
1982 births
Living people
Cuban emigrants to the United States